Neath is a constituency represented in the House of Commons of the UK Parliament since 2015 by Christina Rees, a Labour and Co-operative MP. As of 13th October 2022, she is currently suspended from the party and therefore sitting as an independent, following allegations of bullying.

History

The constituency is located in the preserved county of West Glamorgan, Wales.  It consists of the electoral wards of: Aberdulais, Allt-wen, Blaengwrach, Bryn-côch North, Bryn-côch South, Cadoxton, Cimla, Crynant, Cwmllynfell, Dyffryn, Glynneath, Godre'r Graig, Gwaun-Cae-Gurwen, Lower Brynamman, Neath East, Neath North, Neath South, Onllwyn, Pelenna, Pontardawe, Resolven, Rhos, Seven Sisters, Tonna, Trebanos, Ystalyfera.

The Neath constituency is a mixture of both industrial and rural communities, running in a north–south strip along the dips, ridges and folded landscape of South Wales. It includes most of the Neath and Dulais valleys, and some of the Upper Swansea Valley as well. The town of Neath is at its southern end and is a medium-sized town which started life as a Roman Nidum.

The constituency boasts historical places of both industrial and natural forms. Neath and the surrounding areas were industrialised very early in Britain's history. Copper smelting was already happening here in the late sixteenth century.

When Neath Abbey (now a magnificent ruin) was founded in 1129, it was the richest of all Welsh monasteries, and in writings of the sixteenth century was described as the 'fairest Abbey of all Wales'. At its height it owned extensive lands and property, from Glamorgan to Somerset; had almost 5,000 sheep, as well as horses and cattle; it owned a ship and a landing-place, and worked mills, fisheries and coal-mines. But it suffered greatly during the many skirmishes between the Welsh and English (or Normans), and by the 1530s had only eight monks left. The ruins date mostly from the late thirteenth century. It has been in turn, a prosperous Abbey, a Jacobean Mansion (painted by Turner), an iron foundry (which explains the Abbey's position in the middle of an industrial area) and now an historical monument.

The constituency was heavily mined and the small communities that grew up around these mines were devastated by the collapse of the mining industry in the 1980s. On the edges of many of these communities there are now "Industrial Villages" springing up, helping to replace the jobs lost by the demise of the mining industry, and so helping to keep young people in these communities.

A legacy to Neath's political history is the memorial stone in Victoria Gardens to the 5 Neath citizens killed during the Spanish Civil War of 1936–38.

The constituency remains a Welsh-speaking area, with approximately 26% of the population reported as Welsh speakers.

Members of Parliament

Elections

Elections in the 1910s

Elections in the 1920s

Elections in the 1930s

Elections in the 1940s

Elections in the 1950s

Elections in the 1960s

Elections in the 1970s

Elections in the 1980s

Elections in the 1990s

Elections in the 2000s

Elections in the 2010s

Of the 67 rejected ballots:
44 were either unmarked or it was uncertain who the vote was for.
22 voted for more than one candidate.
1 had writing or mark by which the voter could be identified.

Of the 114 rejected ballots:
81 were either unmarked or it was uncertain who the vote was for.
33 voted for more than one candidate.

Of the 83 rejected ballots:
57 were either unmarked or it was uncertain who the vote was for.
22 voted for more than one candidate.
3 had writing or mark by which the voter could be identified.
1 had want of official mark.

Of the 107 rejected ballots:
84 were either unmarked or it was uncertain who the vote was for.
23 voted for more than one candidate.

See also
 Neath (Senedd constituency)
 List of parliamentary constituencies in West Glamorgan
 List of parliamentary constituencies in Wales

Notes

References

External links
Politics Resources (Election results from 1922 onwards)
Electoral Calculus (Election results from 1955 onwards)
2017 Election House Of Commons Library 2017 Election report
A Vision Of Britain Through Time (Constituency elector numbers)

Further reading
 
 
 A Vision Of Britain Through Time (Constituency elector numbers)

Parliamentary constituencies in South Wales
Politics of Neath Port Talbot
Neath
Constituencies of the Parliament of the United Kingdom established in 1918